Huglo is an island in Stord municipality in Vestland county, Norway. The  island lies in the Hardangerfjorden, just east of the large island of Stord and just south of Tysnesøy. The small island of Skorpo lies immediately northeast of this island.

The island of Huglo has no road connections off of the island other than the regular car ferry routes connecting to Stord and Tysnesøy islands.  There are about 100 inhabitants there and the main industries are farming and the making of furniture and customized golf clubs.

See also
List of islands of Norway

References

Islands of Vestland
Stord